The women's team competition of the 2014 World Judo Championships was held in five weight classes (52 kg — +70 kg), on 31 August.

Medalists

Results

Repechage

Prize money
The sums listed bring the total prizes awarded to 50,000$ for the specific team event.

References

 Draw

External links
 

Women's team
World Women's Team Judo Championships
World 2014
World Wteam